Jack Jacob Camarda (born April 20, 1999) is an American football punter for the Tampa Bay Buccaneers of the National Football League (NFL). He previously played college football at Georgia and was named SEC Special Teams Player of the Year in 2020 before being selected by the Buccaneers in the fourth round of the 2022 NFL Draft.

High school career 
Camarda attended Norcross High School in Norcross, Georgia. As a senior he punted 37 times in 10 games with an average 46.2 yards per punt; his longest punt was 65 yards. He was ranked as a 3-star recruit and the best punter in the class of 2018. He committed to Georgia on April 22, 2017 over the likes of Kentucky and Rutgers.

College career 
As a true freshman at Georgia in 2018, Camarda appeared in 13 games recording 43 punts for 1,830 yards, averaging 42.6 yards. In Camarda's sophomore season, he played in 14 games totaling 61 punts for 2,857 yards, averaging 46.8 yards. As a junior in 2020, Camarda recorded 36 punts for 1,677 yards with an average of 46.6 yards. He was named the SEC Special Teams Player of the Year and was selected to the First-team All-SEC. Camarda decided to come back for a senior season in 2021 rather than to enter the 2021 NFL Draft. In Camarda's senior season, he played in 15 games having 47 punts for 2,197 yards with an average of 46.7 yards. He was named to the First-team All-SEC for a second straight season. Camarda declared for the 2022 NFL Draft on January 17, 2022, one week after winning the National Championship.

Professional career

Camarda was drafted by the Tampa Bay Buccaneers in the fourth round (133rd overall) of the 2022 NFL Draft. On June 9, 2022, he signed his rookie contract. Camarda was named the NFC Special Teams Player of the Week for his performance in Week 9, where he kicked a franchise-tying 74-yard punt, while also placing four of his six punts inside the 20-yard line.

References

External links 
 Tampa Bay Buccaneers
 Georgia Bulldogs Bio

1999 births
Living people
Place of birth missing (living people)
Georgia Bulldogs football players
American football punters
Norcross High School alumni
People from Norcross, Georgia
Players of American football from Georgia (U.S. state)
Sportspeople from the Atlanta metropolitan area
Tampa Bay Buccaneers players